Farthinghoe was a railway station which served the Northamptonshire village of Farthinghoe in England. It opened in 1851 as part of the Buckinghamshire Railway's branch line to Verney Junction which provided connections to Bletchley and Oxford and closed in 1963.

History 
Situated in an isolated location over a mile from the village from which it took its name - and further still from two others it was supposed to serve: Greatworth and Middleton Cheney - Farthinghoe station first appeared in timetables in October 1851. Its precise opening date is unknown, but was almost certainly within one year of the line's inauguration.

The Buckinghamshire Railway provided basic facilities which consisted of a single wooden platform and solitary goods siding on the up side of the line. The main station building, a part-timber and part-brick structure in an "H" shape, was of unusual construction, with the main ticket office and booking hall housed in a one-storey weather-boarded wing with a steeply-pitched gable roof which projected over the platform as a sort of makeshift canopy. The stationmaster occupied an adjacent two-storey building which was linked with the ticket office by a two-storey tile-hung central block which contained a waiting room. The style of construction can be explained by the Buckingham Railway's need to save on costs in the face of an economic crisis.

The station boasted limited goods facilities, with a cattle dock and weigh bridge provided for the mainly agricultural traffic. Until the mid-1930s, goods trains would shunt the siding daily with regular loads of pink roadstone granite as well as coal for W. Palmer & Son, local coal merchants. The Second World War saw Farthinghoe handle ammunition destined for the RAF's Hinton-in-the-Hedges Airfield.

Farthinghoe station was situated on the busiest section of the line, the  stretch from Merton Street to Cockley Brake, where there was a junction with the Stratford-upon-Avon and Midland Junction Railway (SMJ). Opened on 1 June 1872, the section provided connections to Towcester and Blisworth. The LNWR and SMJ jointly served Farthinghoe and Merton Street until they were absorbed into the London, Midland and Scottish Railway on 1 January 1923 upon the railway grouping. The station lost its stationmaster from 1930 and came under the control of Banbury, only 3½ miles away. Former SMJ passenger services were withdrawn as from 2 July 1951. Farthinghoe was itself to close to passengers the following year.

Routes

Present day 
The station buildings have been demolished and replaced by a council dump and pulveriser plant. One feature has, however, survived - a plum tree which stood in the stationmaster's garden. The meadow which adjoined the station and which was used for holding cattle and sheep prior to transfer to Banbury Market is now part of Farthinghoe Nature Reserve.

References

Sources

External links 

Image of the station site

Disused railway stations in Northamptonshire
Former London and North Western Railway stations
Railway stations in Great Britain opened in 1851
Railway stations in Great Britain closed in 1952
1851 establishments in England
West Northamptonshire District